The Billsborough House, at 376 6th Avenue East North in Kalispell, Montana, was built in 1914.  It was listed on the National Register of Historic Places in 1994.

It is a one-and-a-half-story side-gabled Craftsman-style house, with large front and rear dormers and wide bracket-supported eaves.  As of 1994 at least the roof was covered with wood shingles.

The property includes a two-car garage built before 1927.

References

Houses on the National Register of Historic Places in Montana
Houses completed in 1914
Houses in Flathead County, Montana
American Craftsman architecture in Montana
Kalispell, Montana
National Register of Historic Places in Flathead County, Montana
1914 establishments in Montana